Samuel Ryan Bewley (born 22 July 1987) is an amateur podcast host and former professional racing cyclist from New Zealand who last rode for UCI WorldTeam . He also competed for UCI ProTeam  and BikeNZ PureBlack Racing. He competed in nine Grand Tours, including five starts at the Vuelta a España and three starts at the Giro d'Italia. Bewley made his sole Tour de France appearance in the 2020 edition, before retiring from professional cycling at the end of 2022.

Early life
Bewley attended Glenholme Primary School, Rotorua Intermediate School and Rotorua Boys' High School.

Career
At the 2008 Summer Olympics in Beijing, Bewley won the bronze medal as part of the New Zealand team in team pursuit, together with Hayden Roulston, Marc Ryan, and Jesse Sergent.

On 8 October 2009, it was announced that Bewley would join the new UCI ProTeam , which was led by Lance Armstrong and included Levi Leipheimer and Chris Horner.

In May 2012, Bewley joined Australian UCI WorldTeam , and made his first appearance for the team at the Bayern–Rundfahrt. At the 2012 Summer Olympics in London, he was again part of the New Zealand team in the men's pursuit, winning bronze for the second successive Games.

In August 2020, he was named in the startlist for the Tour de France. After a crash in stage 10 of the race, in January 2021 Bewley postponed his return to racing until March, due to long-term injuries.

On 1 August 2022, he announced his intention to retire as a professional cyclist at the end of 2022.

Major results

2003
 1st  Road race, National Novice Road Championships
2005
 UCI Junior Track Cycling World Championships
1st  Team pursuit
2nd  Individual pursuit
 3rd Road race, National Junior Road Championships
2006
 1st Stage 6a Tour of Southland
2007
 1st Stage 1 New Zealand Cycle Classic
 7th Chrono Champenois
2008
 3rd  Team pursuit, Olympic Games
2010
 1st  Team pursuit, 2010–11 UCI Track Cycling World Cup Classics, Cali
 2nd  Team pursuit, Commonwealth Games
 3rd  Team pursuit, UCI Track World Championships
2011
 1st  Team pursuit, 2011–12 UCI Track Cycling World Cup, Cali
 4th Road race, National Road Championships
2012
 1st Stage 3 New Zealand Cycle Classic
 3rd  Team pursuit, Olympic Games
 3rd  Team pursuit, UCI Track World Championships
 3rd  Team time trial, UCI Road World Championships
2015
 1st Stage 1 (TTT) Giro d'Italia
 4th Road race, National Road Championships
2019
 1st Stage 1b (TTT) Settimana Internazionale di Coppi e Bartali

Grand Tour general classification results timeline

Personal life 
Bewley is in a relationship with fellow professional cyclist, Hannah Barnes.

References

External links

Cyclists at the 2008 Summer Olympics
Cyclists at the 2012 Summer Olympics
Olympic cyclists of New Zealand
Olympic bronze medalists for New Zealand
New Zealand track cyclists
1987 births
Living people
Sportspeople from Rotorua
Olympic medalists in cycling
New Zealand male cyclists
Cyclists at the 2010 Commonwealth Games
Medalists at the 2012 Summer Olympics
Medalists at the 2008 Summer Olympics
People educated at Rotorua Boys' High School
Commonwealth Games medallists in cycling
Commonwealth Games silver medallists for New Zealand
Medallists at the 2010 Commonwealth Games